Upper Falls was one of the nine district electoral areas (DEA) which existed in Belfast, Northern Ireland from 1985 to 2014. Located in the west of the city, the district elected five members to Belfast City Council and contained the wards of Andersonstown; Falls Park; Glen Road; Glencolin; and Ladybrook. Upper Falls formed part of the Belfast West constituencies for the Northern Ireland Assembly and UK Parliament. The district, along with the neighbouring Lower Falls district, took its name from the Falls Road, one of the main arterial routes in the west of the city.

History
The district was created for the 1985 local elections. All five wards were part of Area D before 1985. Area D had also contained three wards which became part of the Lower Falls electoral area. Boundary changes for the 2014 local elections created an extra ward in the area and abolished the Upper Falls DEA. Four of the six wards became part of a new Black Mountain District Electoral Area, while the remaining two formed part of a new Collin District Electoral Area, together with parts of the former Lisburn City Council.

Wards

Councillors

2011 Elections

See also
Belfast City Council
Electoral wards of Belfast
Local government in Northern Ireland
Members of Belfast City Council

References

Former District Electoral Areas of Belfast
1985 establishments in Northern Ireland
2014 disestablishments in Northern Ireland